The Iwo Kingdom is a traditional state based on the city of Iwo in Osun State, Nigeria. The Yoruba kingdom, whose ruler is titled "Oluwo of Iwo", was established in the 14th century AD.

The Iwo people, like all other people of Yoruba stock are said to have originally belonged to Ile-Ife from where they migrated sometime in the 14th century. The earliest settlement was founded by Adekola Telu, son of the 16th Ooni of Ife, a female called Luwo Gbagida.
The present city of Iwo was founded in the 16th or 17th century.

Rulers

Rulers of Iwo were:

9 November 2015 until present Oba Abdulrasheed Adewale Akanbi Ilufemiloye Telu 1 from Molaasan Royal family a sub.section of Gbaase ruling house was installed as the 16th Oluwo of Iwoland

References

History of Nigeria
Osun State
Nigerian traditional states
Yoruba history
States and territories established in the 14th century
14th-century establishments in Nigeria